Refco was a New York City-based financial services company, primarily known as a broker of commodities and futures contracts. It was founded in 1969 by Raymond Earl Friedman as Ray E. Friedman and Co. Prior to its collapse in October, 2005, the firm had over $4 billion in approximately 200,000 customer accounts, and it was the largest broker on the Chicago Mercantile Exchange. The firm's balance sheet at the time of the collapse showed about $75 billion in assets and a roughly equal amount in liabilities. Though these filings have since been disowned by the company, they are probably roughly accurate in showing the firm's level of leverage.

Refco became a public company on August 11, 2005, with the sale of 26.5 million shares to the public at $22. It closed the day over 25% higher than that, valuing the entire company at about $3.5 billion. Investors had been attracted to Refco's history of profit growth—it had reported 33% average annual gains in earnings over the four years prior to its initial public offering.

The scandal
Refco Inc. entered crisis on Monday, October 10, 2005, when it announced that its chief executive officer and chairman, Phillip R. Bennett had hidden $430 million in bad debts from the company's auditors and investors, and had agreed to take a leave of absence.

Refco said that through an internal review over the preceding weekend it discovered a receivable owed to the company by an unnamed entity that turned out to be controlled by Mr. Bennett, in the amount of approximately US$430 million. Apparently, Bennett had been buying bad debts from Refco in order to prevent the company from needing to write them off, and was paying for the bad loans with money borrowed by Refco itself. Between 2002 and 2005, he arranged at the end of every quarter for a Refco subsidiary to lend money to a hedge fund called Liberty Corner Capital Strategy, which then lent the money to Refco Group Holdings, an independent offshore company secretly owned by Phillip Bennett with no legal or official connection to Refco. Bennett's company then paid the money back to Refco, leaving Liberty as the apparent borrower when financial statements were prepared. It is not yet clear if Liberty knew it was hiding scam transactions; management of the fund has claimed that they believed it was borrowing from one Refco subsidiary and lending to another Refco sub, and not lending to an entity that Mr. Bennett secretly controlled. On October 20, they announced plans to sue Refco.

In April 2006, papers filed by creditors of Refco seemed to show that Bennett had run a similar scam going back at least to 2000, using Bawag P.S.K. Group in the place of Liberty Corner Capital Strategy.

The law requires that such financial connections between corporation and its own top officers be shown as what is known as a related party transaction in various financial statements. As a result, Refco said, "its financial statements, as of, and for the periods ended, Feb. 28, 2002, Feb. 28, 2003, Feb. 28, 2004, Feb. 28, 2005, and May 31, 2005, taken as a whole, for each of Refco Inc., Refco Group Ltd. LLC and Refco Finance Inc. should no longer be relied upon."

This announcement triggered a number of investigations, and on October 12 Bennett was arrested and charged with one count of securities fraud for using U.S. mail, interstate commerce, and securities exchanges to lie to investors. His lawyer said that Bennett planned to fight the charges. On October 19, trading of Refco's shares was halted on the New York Stock Exchange, which later delisted the company. Before the halt, Refco shares were trading for more than $28 per share, and as of October 19, they had dropped (on the pink sheets) to $0.80 per share.

Refco, Inc. filed for Chapter 11 for a number of its businesses, to seek protection from its creditors on Monday, October 17, 2005. At the time, it declared assets of around $49 billion, which would have made it the fourth largest bankruptcy filing in American history. However, the company subsequently submitted a revised document, claiming it had $16.5 billion in assets and $16.8 billion in liabilities. Refco also announced a tentative agreement to sell its regulated futures and commodities business, which is not covered by the bankruptcy filing, to a group led by J.C. Flowers & Co. for about $768 million. However, other bidders soon emerged, including Interactive Brokers and Dubai Investments, the investment division of the emirate of Dubai. These offers were for a time rebuffed, as the Flowers-led group had a right to a break-up fee if Refco had sold this business to anyone else. Carlos Abadi, involved in the Dubai bid, said that the Dubai-led group offered $1 billion for all of Refco and was rejected. However, the bankruptcy judge in charge of the case deemed the break-up fee unjustified, and the Flowers group withdrew its bid. The business was instead sold to Man Financial on November 10.  Man Financial kept the majority of the Refco futures businesses after selling Refco Overseas Ltd (Refco's European operation) to Marathon Asset Management who then relaunched the business as Marex Financial Limited.

Though of much smaller size, the regulatory impact of the scandal will be larger than for probably any other corporate failure except for Enron. Refco had sold shares to the public in a public offering only two months before revealing the apparent fraud. Their auditors (Grant Thornton) and the investment banks that handled the IPO, Credit Suisse First Boston, Goldman Sachs, and Bank of America Corp., all supposedly completed due diligence on the company, and all missed the CEO's hiding $430 million in bad debts. Their largest private investor was Thomas H. Lee Partners, a highly regarded buyout fund, and the reputation of its managers has been similarly sullied.

On October 27, 2005, shareholders of Refco filed class action lawsuits against Refco, Thomas H. Lee Partners, Grant Thornton, Credit Suisse First Boston, and Goldman Sachs. On March 2, 2006, a lawyer representing Refco's unsecured creditors began steps to sue the IPO underwriters for aiding and abetting the fraud, or for breach of fiduciary duty. In April 2006, creditors sued Bawag P.S.K. Group for more than $1.3 billion.

In April 2006, Christie's auction house sold Refco's prized art collection, which included photographs by Charles Ray and Andy Warhol.

On February 15, 2008, Phillip R. Bennett pleaded guilty to 20 charges of securities fraud and other criminal charges. On July 3, 2008, Bennett was sentenced to 16 years in federal prison.

The $430 million in bad debts
Though no detailed report on Bennett's transactions has yet been made public, anonymous sources cited by The Wall Street Journal and other publications have stated that the debt stemmed from losses in as many as 10 customer trading accounts, including that of Ross Capital, and the widely reported October 27, 1997, trading losses of hedge fund manager Victor Niederhoffer. Niederhoffer said on his website in response to these news articles that Refco wanted to take over the assets in his accounts and assume all the liabilities in order to meet capital requirements, and that he and Refco signed a formal agreement to that effect on Oct. 29, 1997, in the presence of two major law firms and under the close scrutiny of regulators. "There were no debts, loans, or any other financial obligations left open between us," Niederhoffer said. "Refco received considerable assets from us as part of our agreement. I don't know how much money Refco received for these assets, or how it accounted for the transaction, or whether it ended up with a profit or loss. If Refco did suffer a loss, I am confident that it was quite minimal relative to the $460 million receivable said to have been a key link in the firm’s debacle, or to the actual sums that the principals and key players of the firm took out many years later." The story in the Journal implies that Refco settled Niederhoffer's debt for positions that were worth less than he owed them, or perhaps that they accrued trading losses unwinding those positions.

Ross Capital has also been named by the Wall Street Journal's anonymous sources as one of the firms with losses that somehow led to Bennett's $430 million debt. Ross Capital is run by Wolfgang Flottl, whose father used to run Bawag P.S.K. Group, an Austrian bank that lent Bennett the money to repay Refco. In 1999, Bawag purchased 10% of Refco in a private transaction, and had an outstanding loan of 75 million euros to Refco at the time the firm collapsed. On October 5, before news of the hidden loan was made public, Phillip Bennett applied for a 350 million euro loan, to be collateralized with his shares in Refco. The loan was granted on October 10, and Bennett used it to pay off the hidden $430 million. The Refco stock that collateralized the loan is now worthless, and on November 16, Bawag joined the line of people suing Refco, demanding 350 million euros plus punitive damages in compensation for the company's failure to disclose information that would have discouraged Bawag from lending the money to Bennett. The Austrian National Bank and Financial Market Authority were investigating Bawag's involvement with Refco.

The apparent fraud was caught by Peter James, Refco's newly hired controller. Apparently, in the fiscal quarter before the story broke, Bennett failed to execute his temporary Liberty Strategies-hidden repayment of debt. This left the position on the books for James to find. It is unclear why the firm's chief financial officer had not spotted the loan, but the firm's previous CFO, Robert Trosten, left Refco in October, 2004 with a $45 million payout that was not disclosed in the firm's IPO prospectus. He was under investigation by regulators, who suspected he may have known something about Bennett's malfeasance. Robert C. Trosten pleaded
guilty to five charges in 2008. Tone N. Grant, a Refco official, was convicted of 5 charges on April 17, 2008. He was sentenced to 10 years on August 8, 2008.

$525 million in fake bonds
On March 15, 2006, information leaked by the U.S. prosecutor's office revealed that Refco held offshore accounts holding as much as $525 million in fake bonds. The company held the "securities" for Bawag P.S.K., the Austrian bank with which Refco had a close relationship, discussed in part above, and for a non-U.S. hedge fund called Liquid Opportunity. Apparently, Bawag and Liquid Opportunity jointly owned six Anguilla companies, which in turn owned the fake bonds. Refco's attorneys have declined to comment.

Apparently, the six Anguilla companies initially responded to Refco's bankruptcy filing as a normal customer would have, filing as creditors with a combined claim of $543 million. However, they failed to follow up with any legal filings.

This is presumably good news for other Refco customers, in that $543 million in potential claims on the firm's assets have disappeared. The likelihood that the fake bonds represent some kind of ongoing criminal activity does not bode well for the principals of Refco, BAWAG, or Liquid Opportunity.

Older scandals
Refco has not enjoyed a clean reputation with regulators. The Commodity Futures Trading Commission and the National Futures Association took action against Refco and its units more than 100 times since the firm's founding. According to The Wall Street Journal, it was "among the most cited brokers in the business, according to data provided by the NFA."

In 2001, the NFA ordered Refco to pay $43 million to 13 investors after their Refco broker used bogus order tickets to clear trades.

On May 16, 2005, the company disclosed that it had received a "Wells notice", indicating it might face charges related to improper short selling at its Refco Securities unit and other matters. The company had been implicated in naked short sales on the stock of a company called Sedona Corp., disclosed that it was negotiating with the SEC and hoped to reach a settlement that would likely include an injunction against future violations and "payment of a substantial civil penalty." Refco put $5 million in reserve in anticipation of the settlement. The company has also been sued by Sedona in connection with this trading.

References

External links

Further reading

 "Lure of Refco on Rocks," New York Times, October 18, 2005
 "Creditors Look For Their Share Of Refco Assets" Wall Street Journal, October 20, 2005
 "'Naked Shorting' Case Lurks in Refco's Past"  Wall Street Journal, October 20, 2005
 "Thomas Lee May Delay Fund After Refco, Person Says," Bloomberg News, October 20, 2005
 "Bawag Says It Tried to Halt Refco Loans Hours After Transfer," Bloomberg News, October 20, 2005
 "Bawag Scrutiny Mounts, Putting CEO to the Test," Wall Street Journal, October 21, 2005
 "Refco's Debts Started With Several Clients," Wall Street Journal, October 21, 2005
 "Bennett's Refco Scheme Exposed by Late-Night Hunch: 'It Hit Me'", Bloomberg News, October 27, 2005

American companies established in 1969
American companies disestablished in 2005
Financial services companies established in 1969
Financial services companies disestablished in 2005
Companies that filed for Chapter 11 bankruptcy in 2005
1969 establishments in New York City
2005 disestablishments in New York (state)
2005 initial public offerings
Defunct financial services companies of the United States
Defunct companies based in New York City
Financial services companies based in New York City
Companies formerly listed on the New York Stock Exchange
Corporate scandals